The Digital Library of Slovenia (short: dLib) is an Internet service—since 2006 a part of European Library—that allows access to digitalized material from the National and University Library of Slovenia.

Collections
Since 2005, its web portal offers a free search through sources and free access to Slovene newspapers, periodicals, books, manuscripts, map, photographs, music and manuals, and other resources. 
 articles from older Slovene newspapers, such as (Kmetijske in rokodelske novice, Ljubljanski zvon, Dom in svet, Novi akordi, Sodobnost, Štajerc, Nova muzika).
 more than 10,500 items in the photos collection, which includes the photos of caricatures, drawn by Maksim Gaspari and Hinko Smrekar; reproductions of Ivan Cankar's drawings and manuscripts; and postcards with Jurij Vega, France Prešeren, and old Ljubljana
 books from 1830 until today provides free access to some of the most important works of the Slovenian authors, such as Ivan Cankar's Erotika, Nina, Hlapci; Dragotin Kette's Poezije; Josip Murn's Pesmi in romance. 
 more than 3,000 scholarly articles published in many internationally recognised professional and scientific journals. 
 a collection of 4,000 advertising, promotional, film, and war posters
 more than 1,000 items of sheet music, including one of the first arrangements of Prešeren's Zdravica (Slovenian national anthem); compositions by the Ipavec family, Danilo Fajgelj, Risto Savin, Stanko Premrl, Emil Adamič, Slavko Osterc, Marij Kogoj; and arrangements of the Slovenian folk songs and the songs from the turning points in the Slovene history 
 the selection of old maps, including Valvasor's maps of Carniola, and old city plans of Ljubljana (from 1820 to 1920). 
 recordings of solo singers and ensembles dating from the beginning of the 20th century, including a wide range of Slovene folk songs.

See also 
 National and University Library of Slovenia
 European Library

References

External links 
 The Digital Library of Slovenia
 National Library of Slovenia

Slovenian digital libraries
Bibliographic databases and indexes